Estadio Corregidora is a stadium in Querétaro City, Mexico. The venue is used mostly for football games as the home of Querétaro FC. It is also used for concerts, hosting internationally known pop stars like Rod Stewart, Miguel Bosé, and Shakira, among others.

The stadium is considered one of the most notable stadiums in Mexico. Its design allows for the safe exit of all spectators, even if full, in less than seven minutes. It is one of the largest football venues in Mexico, after Estadio Azteca, Estadio Olímpico Universitario, Estadio Azul (all in Mexico City), Estadio Cuauhtémoc in Puebla, Estadio BBVA Bancomer in greater Monterrey, and Estadio Jalisco in Guadalajara.

Built in 1985 in a collaboration between Mexican and European partners, Estadio Corregidora acted as a venue for the FIFA World Cup hosted the following year by Mexico. During the Clausura 2022 tournament, the stadium was the site of a fan riot during, and after, a match that was suspended as a result. Later, Liga MX authorities announced a one year veto for the stadium.

International Competition
 1986 FIFA World Cup
 2011 FIFA U-17 World Cup

1986 FIFA World Cup

2022 Estadio Corregidora riots

On 5 March 2022, Liga MX club Querétaro FC hosted Atlas FC at La Corregidora for matchday 9 of the Clausura 2022 tournament. At the 63rd minute, fighting between fans of both teams broke out in the stadium's stands. The match was stopped immediately, and the teams' players returned to their respective dressing rooms. The sparse security elements in the stadium were unable to control the situation and opened the stadium's exits to allow spectators to escape the violence, which had spread to the pitch.

Due to the developing events at the stadium, the match was suspended by its head referee, with the score at Querétaro 0 - 1 Atlas. Liga MX president Mikel Arriola stated that "those responsible for the lack of security in the stadium will be punished in an exemplary manner." The league announced that the remainder of the match's second half would be played at a future date.

On 8 March 2022, Liga MX authorities announced a one year veto for the stadium.

See also
 List of football stadiums in Mexico

References

External links
 World Stadiums entry

Querétaro F.C.
La Corregidora
1986 FIFA World Cup stadiums
Sports venues in Querétaro
Sports venues completed in 1985
1985 establishments in Mexico